Santiago Martín Pérez Casal (born 8 November 1998) is a Uruguayan footballer who plays as a defender for Villa Española.

References

External links
Profile at Sofa Score

1998 births
Living people
Club Atlético River Plate (Montevideo) players
Uruguayan Segunda División players
Uruguayan footballers
Association football defenders